Reno W. Trego was a member of the Wisconsin State Assembly.

Biography
Trego was born on August 24, 1877, in Benton County, Iowa. From 1898 to 1901, Trego was a member of the Iowa National Guard. On August 15, 1911, he married Sevilla Ridenour. Trego moved to Wood County, Wisconsin in 1918 and to Merrill, Wisconsin in 1923. He died on November 3, 1961, in Wausau, Wisconsin and is buried in Garrison, Iowa.

Political career
Trego was a member of the Assembly from 1937 to 1940. He was a member of the Wisconsin Progressive Party.

References

External links

People from Benton County, Iowa
People from Wood County, Wisconsin
People from Merrill, Wisconsin
Members of the Wisconsin State Assembly
Wisconsin Progressives (1924)
20th-century American politicians
Military personnel from Wisconsin
United States Army soldiers
1877 births
1961 deaths
Iowa National Guard personnel